Stephen White (born 1948), is an American science fiction author best known as the co-author of the Starfire series along with David Weber.

He is married with three daughters and currently lives in Charlottesville, Virginia. He also works for a legal publishing company. He previously served as a United States Navy officer and served during the Vietnam War and in the Mediterranean region.

Career
Stephen White wrote short stories set in the Starfire universe that were published by Task Force Games in their Nexus magazine, and wrote the Starfire novel Insurrection (1990) with David Weber after Nexus was cancelled in 1988; this book was the first in a tetralogy that concluded with their final collaboration, The New York Times bestseller The Shiva Option (2002). White also continued the series with Exodus (2007), co-authored with Shirley Meier.

Published works 

Prince of Sunset
Prince of Sunset   (1998) 
Emperor of Dawn  (1999)

Starfire series
Insurrection  with David Weber (1990) 
Crusade  with David Weber (1992) 
In Death Ground   with David Weber (1997)
The Shiva Option  with David Weber (2002) 
Exodus  with Shirley Meier (2007) 
Extremis  with Charles E. Gannon (2011) 
Imperative  with Charles E. Gannon (2016) 
Oblivion  with Charles E. Gannon (2018)
The Stars at War  is an omnibus hardcover re-issue of Crusade and In Death Ground (2004) 
The Stars at War II  is an omnibus hardcover re-issue of The Shiva Option and Insurrection with 20,000 words of connecting material and restored edits (2005)

The Disinherited
The Disinherited   (1993) 
Legacy  (1995)
Debt of Ages  (1995)

The Stars
Eagle Against the Stars   (2000) 
Wolf Among the Stars  (November 2011)

Jason Thanou
Blood of the Heroes (2006) 
Sunset of the Gods (January 2013)  
Pirates of the Time Stream (August 2013)  
Ghosts of Time (July 2014)  
Soldiers Out of Time (August 2015) 
Gods of Dawn (August 2017) 
The Jason Thanou short story "The Last Secret of Mary Bowser (2014)" was published before the release of Ghosts of Time at baen.com.

Other novels
 Forge of the Titans  (2003)
 Demon's Gate  (2004)
 The Prometheus Project  (2005) 
 Saint Antony's Fire  (2008)
 Her Majesty's American  (September 4, 2018)

References

External links
 Steve White, Author Listing at Baen Books
 White, Steve and David Weber, The Stars at War
 

1948 births
20th-century American male writers
20th-century American novelists
20th-century American short story writers
21st-century American male writers
21st-century American novelists
21st-century American short story writers
American male novelists
American male short story writers
American science fiction writers
Living people